Eze Nri Agụ was the ninth king of Nri Kingdom after succeeding Eze Nri Fenenu. He reigned from 1583–1676 CE.

References

Nri-Igbo
Nri monarchs
Kingdom of Nri
1676 deaths
17th-century monarchs in Africa